Brady Smith may refer to:

Brady Smith (actor) (born 1971), American actor and artist
Brady Smith (American football) (born 1973), American football player
Brady Smith (soccer) (born 1989), Australian soccer player